Lady Anne House is a former almshouse, now a hotel, in York, in England.

The almshouse was founded by Ann Middleton, in 1659, on a site on Skeldergate, in the Bishophill area of York.  Known as Middleton's Hospital, it had 22 apartments around a small yard, housing twenty  widows.

In 1827, the hospital was demolished, and rebuilt further back from the street, as a two-storey brick structure.  It was designed by Peter Atkinson, and was completed in 1829.  The garden walls also date from this period.  In the centre of the front is a statue of a woman in Puritan dress, which is believed to survive from the original building.

In 1939, the building was modernised, to house ten residents and a warden; however, by 1972, the building was in a poor state of repair.  It was purchased by the owners of the hotel at 56 Skeldergate, who restored it, and incorporated it into their hotel, which is now known as Middletons Hotel.  Since 1997, it has been a Grade II* listed building.

References

Grade II* listed buildings in York
Buildings and structures completed in 1829
Almshouses in York
Hotels in York